Fujiwara no Kishi (藤原（西園寺）嬉子; 1252 – 26 May 1318), later Imadegawa-in (今出川院), was an Empress consort of Japan. She was the consort of Emperor Kameyama of Japan. She was Saionji Kinsuke's daughter.

In 1283 she ordained as a Buddhist nun and was given the Dharma name Busshōkaku (仏性覚).

Notes

Fujiwara clan
Japanese empresses
Japanese Buddhist nuns
13th-century Buddhist nuns
14th-century Buddhist nuns
1252 births
1318 deaths